This is a list of games developed and/or published by Bandai Namco Entertainment and generally covers titles released after 31 March 2006. Games published by Bandai or Namco prior to the merger are not listed here.

Video games

Mobile games

Distributed titles
MotoGP 14, Ride, MotoGP 15, Sébastien Loeb Rally Evo and Valentino Rossi: The Game were developed and published by Milestone srl.
Lords of the Fallen was developed and published by CI Games.
F1 2015 was developed and published by Codemasters.
Project CARS was developed and published by Slightly Mad Studios.
The Witcher 2: Assassins of Kings Enhanced Edition, The Witcher 3: Wild Hunt and Cyberpunk 2077 were developed and published by CD Projekt (PAL regions only).
Disney Infinity was developed by Avalanche Software and published by Disney Interactive Studios (Japan only)

See also 
List of Namco games
List of Bandai games
List of Tales media
Tales of Mobile

References

Namco Bandai